Storm Warning is a Big Finish Productions audio drama based on the long-running British science fiction television series Doctor Who.  Storm Warning was the first audio drama to feature the Eighth Doctor, as played by Paul McGann; the story was his first return to the role after the 1996 television movie.

This audio drama was broadcast on BBC 7 in four weekly parts starting on 6 August 2005, the first of the Big Finish audio dramas to be broadcast in this way.  BBC7 repeated the serial beginning on 27 August 2006, and repeated it again on 13 and 14 September 2007.

Cast
The Doctor – Paul McGann
Charley Pollard – India Fisher
Lord Tamworth – Gareth Thomas
Lt-Col Frayling – Nicholas Pegg
Chief Steward Weeks – Hylton Collins
Triskele – Helen Goldwyn
Rathbone – Barnaby Edwards

References

External links
 Big Finish Productions – Storm Warning

2001 audio plays
Eighth Doctor audio plays
Radio plays based on Doctor Who
2005 radio dramas
Fiction set in 1930